Old Town Residential Historic District may refer to:

 Old Town Residential Historic District (Pocatello, Idaho), listed in the NRHP in Idaho
 Old Town Residential Historic District (Las Vegas, New Mexico), listed on the NRHP in New Mexico
 Old Town Residential Historic District (Palestine, Texas), listed on the NRHP in Texas